Mario Corti (born Lausanne, October 22, 1946) is a Swiss businessman who acted as chairman of Swissair.

Early years and education 
In 1975, Corti earned a master's degree in business administration from Harvard Business School. He earned a doctorate in economics from the University of Lausanne.

Career 
After graduation from Harvard Business School, Corti worked as a business planner for Kaiser Aluminum & Chemical Corporation in California. Following his return to his home country in 1977, he worked first at the Swiss National Bank and then as Under Secretary for Foreign Trade. In 1990, he accepted a position with Nestlé USA and became chief financial officer in 1996. In April 2000, Corti left Nestle and joined SwissAir. Corti began his term as the Swissair CEO in March 2001.
He was put on trial, accused of unlawful management in regards to the failure of Swissair in 2001. Corti  was acquitted of all charges.

Private life 
Corti is also known as "Super Mario". In 1992 Corti flew a twin-engine plane around the globe as a pilot and in 1999 across the Atlantic.

References

Swiss businesspeople
Living people
People from Lausanne
1946 births
20th-century Swiss businesspeople
21st-century Swiss businesspeople
University of Lausanne alumni
Harvard Business School alumni